Amphisbaena caetitensis is a worm lizard species in the family Amphisbaenidae. It is endemic to Brazil.

References

caetitensis
Reptiles described in 2018
Taxa named by João Paulo Felix Augusto de Almeida
Taxa named by Marco A. de Freitas
Taxa named by Marcio Borba da Silva
Taxa named by Maria Celeste Costa Valverde
Taxa named by Miguel Trefaut Rodrigues
Taxa named by Adriano Moreira Pires
Taxa named by Tami Mott
Endemic fauna of Brazil
Reptiles of Brazil